The 1958–59 Challenge Cup was the 58th staging of rugby league's oldest knockout competition, the Challenge Cup.

The final was contested by Wigan and Hull F.C. at Wembley Stadium in London.

The final was played on Saturday 9 May 1959, where Wigan beat Hull 30–13 in front of a crowd of 79,811.

The Lance Todd Trophy was awarded to Wigan  Brian McTigue.

First round

Second round

Quarterfinals

Semifinals

Final

References

External links
Challenge Cup official website 
Challenge Cup 1958/59 results at Rugby League Project

Challenge Cup
Challenge Cup